{{Drugbox
| verifiedrevid = 449586687
| IUPAC_name = N-(1-Methyl-1H-indol-5-yl)-''N-(3-methylisothiazol-5-yl)urea
| image = SB-204,741_structure.png
| width = 220

| tradename =  
| pregnancy_AU = 
| pregnancy_US = 
| pregnancy_category =  
| legal_AU = 
| legal_CA =  
| legal_UK =  
| legal_US =  
| legal_status =  
| routes_of_administration =  

| bioavailability =  
| protein_bound =  
| metabolism =  
| elimination_half-life =  
| excretion =  

| CAS_number_Ref = 
| CAS_number = 152239-46-8
| UNII_Ref = 
| UNII = 9VHM49MS42
| ATC_prefix =  
| ATC_suffix =  
| PubChem = 3277600
| ChEBI = 140936
| IUPHAR_ligand = 221
| DrugBank_Ref = 
| DrugBank =  
|  ChemSpiderID = 2526822

| C=14 | H=14 | N=4 | O=1 | S=1 
| smiles = c2c(C)nsc2NC(=O)Nc3ccc1n(C)ccc1c3
| synonyms = SB-204,741
|  StdInChI = 1S/C14H14N4OS/c1-9-7-13(20-17-9)16-14(19)15-11-3-4-12-10(8-11)5-6-18(12)2/h3-8H,1-2H3,(H2,15,16,19)
|  StdInChIKey = USFUFHFQWXDVMH-UHFFFAOYSA-N
}}SB-204741''' is a drug which acts as a potent and selective antagonist at the serotonin 5-HT2B receptor, with around 135x selectivity over the closely related 5-HT2C receptor, and even higher over the 5-HT2A receptor and other targets. It is used in scientific research for investigating the functions of the 5-HT2B receptor.

References 

5-HT2B antagonists
Isothiazoles
Ureas
Indoles